Dean C. Fisher (born September 3, 1956) is the Iowa State Representative from the 53rd District.  A Republican, he has served in the Iowa House of Representatives since 2013.

Early life and education

Fisher was born and raised in Garwin, Iowa in Tama County. He resides in rural Montour, on a heritage farm which has been in his family since 1852.

Fisher is a 1975 graduate of South Tama Community High School. He earned a Bachelor of Electronics Engineering Technology from DeVry Institute of Technology in Chicago, Illinois, in 1978.

Career

Fisher spent 26 years in the electronics industry as an engineer, engineering manager, and business manager. Fisher worked for Qwint Systems, IO Vision, Autotech, and at Motorola in the Automotive Electronics division from 1986 until 2004.

Fisher was the chair of his county's Republican Party from 2010 to 2011.  Fisher also served as the Indian Village Township Clerk from 2008 to 2013.

Personal life
Fisher is a member of the National Rifle Association, Iowa Firearms Coalition and the Amateur Trapshooting Association and the Iowa State Trapshooting Association. He is also a member of the Farm Bureau, the American Motorcycle Association, A.B.A.T.E., The Heritage Foundation,  and the Colonial Williamsburg Foundation's W.A.R. Goodwin Society. 
Among his hobbies are woodworking, model airplanes, motorcycling, quilting, genealogy, horticulture, astronomy, trapshooting, and hunting.

References

External links 
 Dean Fisher at ballotpedia.org

1956 births
Living people
People from Tama County, Iowa
DeVry University alumni
Farmers from Iowa
Republican Party members of the Iowa House of Representatives
21st-century American politicians